Player's Option: Spells & Magic is an accessory for the 2nd edition of the Advanced Dungeons & Dragons fantasy role-playing game, published in 1996.

Contents
Player's Option: Spells & Magic, the third and final book in the Player's Option rulebooks series, takes an in-depth look at magic in AD&D. Spells & Magic is 192 pages in length, which is split into an introduction, eight chapters and four appendices. The introduction offers advice on integrating the material into an existing campaign, and discussed such factors as the power, scarcity, and use in storytelling of magic in AD&D.

The first two chapters discuss wizards and priests, respectively, beginning with the various wizard schools and priest spheres of access and some minor changes to the spell lists, then specialist classes (including some new classes), and closing with an expanded version of the customized character class rules from Player's Option: Skills & Powers. The third chapter looks at other spellcasting classes, including bards, rangers, and paladins, including optional abilities and limitations; the chapter also discusses multi-classed characters and magic-using monsters. The fourth chapter covers proficiencies, comparing the standard "slot" system to the character point rules introduced by Skills & Powers, lists a range of new proficiencies for wizards and priests, and introduces "signature spells" which allow wizard characters to gain bonuses when casting a particular spell. The fifth chapter examines equipment for spellcasters, offering rules for wizards' laboratories and priests' altars, discusses the advantages and disadvantages of using spell components in the game and presents rules for gathering and buying them, and closes with an examination of magic shops including arcanists and apothecaries. The sixth chapter offers alternate magic systems, the seventh chapter offers expanded and revised rules for researching new spells and creating new magic items, and the last chapter offers new rules for spellcasting in combat. The first two appendices consist of new spells, and the last two appendices offer revised lists of wizard spells by school and priest spells by sphere.

Publication history
Player's Option: Spells & Magic was published by TSR, Inc. in 1996.

Reception
Andy Butcher reviewed Player's Option: Spells & Magic for Arcane magazine, rating it a 7 out of 10 overall. He felt that the chapter on alternate magic systems "contains the most ambitious and far-reaching options in the book". He adds that the rules "are compatible with the first Player's Option book, Combat & Tactics, and include a range of new tables and spells that allow for arms to be disintegrated, rib cages to be crushed and a range of other gruesome effects". He complains about the inclusion of "obligatory" new spells: "It seems that TSR still finds it impossible to release an AD&D supplement that concerns magic without throwing in at least 50 of these, nevertheless, some of those on offer are interesting (if somewhat potent). He commented on the revised spell lists: "Although most of the changes are fairly minor, they do go a long way towards making sense of these confusing aspects of the game." Butcher concluded of the book: "As the last book in the Player's Options series, Spells & Magic achieves what it sets out to do. It's the most in-depth look at every aspect of magic in AD&D so far, offers a host of optional and expanded rules for dealing with it in the game, and complements the other Player's Option books perfectly." Butcher goes on to say, "However, by offering a means for referees to customise the way magic works in the game, it also goes some way to solving the inherent limitations of AD&D. The magic system has always been cited as one of the key weaknesses of the rules by its detractors, and it has to be said that they have a point. The basic system models one particular style of magic (heavily inspired by Jack Vance's Dying Earth books), and this lack of flexibility has often been the cause of headaches for referees and players alike. The spell point system, though not perfect, does offer alternatives to the standard 'memorise and spell, and then forget it when you cast it' system, and is a welcome addition." Addressing some of the challenges with the book and the Player's Option series, he continues: "Player's Option: Spells & Magic is not without a couple of problems, though, both of which are related to the other books in the series. Firstly, although you don't actually need the other books, they're certainly very helpful and some sections of Spells & Magic are of little use without them. On a more general note, Spells & Magic shares the same downside as the entire series - by using the Player's Option books it's possible to completely customise your AD&D game, and overcome many of the limitations of the basic rules. However, doing so adds significantly to the complexity of the game". Butcher concludes his review by stating: "Still, there's no denying that both on its own and as the final part of the series, Spells & Magic is an interesting and useful book for any AD&D referee.

Reviews
Dragon #234

References

Dungeons & Dragons sourcebooks
Role-playing game supplements introduced in 1996